Vilhelm Bruno Söderström (28 October 1881 – 1 January 1969) was a Swedish track and field athlete. He competed at the 1906 Intercalated Games and 1908 Summer Olympics in the javelin throw, pole vault and high jump and won three medals. He also served as the Swedish flag bearer at the 1906 Games. His elder brother Gustaf competed in athletics events at the 1900 Games.

Besides athletics, Söderström was a banker and a sports administrator. In 1909, after visiting the United States, he began popularizing bowling in Sweden and building first bowling venues there. Next year he founded Idrottsbladet, which soon became the major Swedish sports newspaper, and became its first editor. He later wrote several books in various genres, including fiction.

References

External links
 

Swedish male high jumpers
Swedish male pole vaulters
Swedish male javelin throwers
Athletes from Stockholm
Olympic silver medalists for Sweden
Olympic bronze medalists for Sweden
Athletes (track and field) at the 1906 Intercalated Games
Athletes (track and field) at the 1908 Summer Olympics
Olympic athletes of Sweden
1881 births
1969 deaths

Medalists at the 1908 Summer Olympics
Medalists at the 1906 Intercalated Games
Olympic silver medalists in athletics (track and field)
Olympic bronze medalists in athletics (track and field)